Vesyoly is a rural locality (a khutor) in Zarevskoye Rural Settlement of Shovgenovsky District, the Republic of Adygea, Russia. The population was 249 as of 2018. There are 3 streets.

Geography 
Vesyoly is located 23 km southeast of Khakurinokhabl (the district's administrative centre) by road. Chernyshyov is the nearest rural locality.

References 

Rural localities in Shovgenovsky District